Aline is a Brazilian adult comic strip created by Adão Iturrusgarai, first published in 1996 by the newspaper Folha de S.Paulo.

The comics follows the titular character that is a young adult girl who lives a three-way love relationship, making humor about issues such as femininity and sexual liberation. The girl works at a record store, hates cooking and cleaning the house, and lives with two guys: Otto and Pedro. She is said to be a nymphomaniac (sex addict). Others, however, say that she only "gives free rein to the sexual instincts". The author describes her as a "shameless person". Aline remained in the twenty-year-old age group until her last publication in 2009. In 2014, to celebrate the twentieth anniversary of the strip, Adão returned to the character of Aline at forty years old, now with problems inherent to age and a daughter, Luna. However, new stories with Aline being young returned a while later.

In 2005, 5 animated shorts based on the strip were produced, shown by the Brazilian version of Cartoon Network (in association with Warner Bros.), in the Adult Swim block. In the animated version, Aline had the voice of Fernanda Baronne while Otto and Pedro were dubbed by Manolo Rey.

In 2008 the strip was adapted into a live-action TV special on Globo. The special spun off a TV series that aired on the same channel between 2009 and 2011.

Aline was awarded as the best national strip in the Troféu HQ Mix in the years 2000 and 2001.

References

Brazilian comic strips
1996 comics debuts
Humor comics
Female characters in comics
Comics about women
Black comedy comics
Erotic comics
Romantic comedy comics
Comics adapted into animated series
Comics adapted into television series
Rede Globo original programming

pt:Aline (Adão Iturrusgarai)